Eddy County is a county in the U.S. state of North Dakota. As of the 2020 census, the population was 2,347. Its county seat is New Rockford.

History
The Dakota Territory legislature created the county on March 31, 1885, with territory partitioned from Foster County. It was named for Ezra B. Eddy, a Fargo, North Dakota banker who had died a few weeks earlier. The county government was established on April 27, 1885.

Geography
The Sheyenne River flows easterly through the upper part of the county. The county terrain consists of semi-arid hills, featuring some agriculture. The terrain slopes to the east and slightly to the north, with its highest point on a hill at the county's southwestern corner, at 1,562' (476m) ASL. It is the smallest county in North Dakota by area.

Adjacent counties

 Benson County – north
 Nelson County – northeast
 Griggs County – southeast
 Foster County – south
 Wells County – west

Major highways
  U.S. Highway 281
  North Dakota Highway 15
  North Dakota Highway 20

County roads

 Eddy County Road 1
 Eddy County Road 2
 Eddy County Road 3
 Eddy County Road 4
 Eddy County Road 5
 Eddy County Road 6
 Eddy County Road 7
 Eddy County Road 8
 Eddy County Road 9
 Eddy County Road 10
 Eddy County Road 12
 Eddy County Road 14
 Eddy County Road 16

Eddy County Road 14 is a north-south County Road in North Dakota. It runs from North Dakota Highway 15 near New Rockford to Eddy County Road 9 (1st Ave North) in downtown New Rockford. Eddy County Road 9 is an east-west County Road in North Dakota. It runs from US 281/Highway 15 (1st Street) in New Rockford to Wells County CR 2, near New Rockford.

National protected area
 Johnson Lake National Wildlife Refuge (part)

Demographics

2000 census
As of the 2000 census, there were 2,757 people, 1,164 households, and 743 families residing in the county. The population density was 4 people per square mile (2/km2). There were 1,418 housing units at an average density of 2 per square mile (1/km2). The racial makeup of the county was 96.37% White, 0.07% Black or African American, 2.36% Native American, 0.15% Asian, 0.07% Pacific Islander, 0.25% from other races, and 0.73% from two or more races. 0.62% of the population were Hispanic or Latino of any race. 44.1% were of Norwegian and 32.5% German ancestry.

There were 1,164 households, out of which 27.70% had children under the age of 18 living with them, 56.40% were married couples living together, 5.00% had a female householder with no husband present, and 36.10% were non-families. 34.20% of all households were made up of individuals, and 20.40% had someone living alone who was 65 years of age or older. The average household size was 2.30 and the average family size was 2.96.

The county population contained 23.60% under the age of 18, 6.10% from 18 to 24, 22.50% from 25 to 44, 23.10% from 45 to 64, and 24.70% who were 65 years of age or older. The median age was 44 years. For every 100 females there were 95.50 males. For every 100 females age 18 and over, there were 92.30 males.

The median income for a household in the county was $28,642, and the median income for a family was $37,625. Males had a median income of $24,063 versus $20,344 for females. The per capita income for the county was $15,941. About 6.90% of families and 9.70% of the population were below the poverty line, including 11.50% of those under age 18 and 11.00% of those age 65 or over.

2010 census
As of the 2010 census, there were 2,385 people, 1,057 households, and 653 families in the county. The racial makeup of the county was 95.2% white, 2.4% American Indian, 0.3% Asian, 0.2% black or African American, 0.1% Pacific islander, 0.8% from other races, and 1.0% from two or more races. Those of Hispanic or Latino origin made up 2.2% of the population. In terms of ancestry, 52.7% were German, 45.9% were Norwegian, 9.3% were Irish, 6.5% were Swedish, and 1.3% were American.

Of the 1,057 households, 24.2% had children under the age of 18 living with them, 50.9% were married couples living together, 7.4% had a female householder with no husband present, 38.2% were non-families, and 33.9% of all households were made up of individuals. The average household size was 2.18 and the average family size was 2.77. The median age was 49.2 years.

The median income for a household in the county was $38,404 and the median income for a family was $47,857. Males had a median income of $31,887 versus $28,194 for females. The per capita income for the county was $20,302. About 11.5% of families and 15.4% of the population were below the poverty line, including 21.0% of those under age 18 and 21.7% of those age 65 or over.

Communities

Cities
 New Rockford (county seat)
 Sheyenne

Unincorporated communities
 Brantford
 Hamar

Townships

 Bush
 Cherry Lake
 Columbia
 Colvin
 Eddy
 Freeborn
 Gates
 Grandfield
 Hillsdale
 Lake Washington
 Munster
 New Rockford
 Paradise
 Pleasant Prairie
 Rosefield
 Sheldon
 Superior
 Tiffany

Politics
Eddy County voters tend to vote Republican. In 71% percent of the national elections since 1960, the county selected the Republican Party candidate.

See also
 National Register of Historic Places listings in Eddy County, North Dakota

References

External links
 ND DOT county map of Eddy Country (PDF)

 
1885 establishments in Dakota Territory
Populated places established in 1885